Écollemont is a commune in the Marne department in north-eastern France.

Geography
The Blaise forms the commune's northern border.

The Lake Der-Chantecoq forms part of the commune's southern border.

See also
Communes of the Marne department

References

Communes of Marne (department)